TRNA (guanine6-N2)-methyltransferase (methyltransferase Trm14, m2G6 methyltransferase) is an enzyme with systematic name S-adenosyl-L-methionine:tRNA (guanine6-N2)-methyltransferase. This enzyme catalyses the following chemical reaction

 S-adenosyl-L-methionine + guanine6 in tRNA  S-adenosyl-L-homocysteine + N2-methylguanine6 in tRNA

The enzyme specifically methylates guanine6 at N2 in tRNA.

References

External links 
 

EC 2.1.1